Ernie Jones (9 December 1919 – May 2011) was a Welsh footballer, who played as a forward in the Football League for Chester.

References

Chester City F.C. players
1919 births
Bangor City F.C. players
English Football League players
Association football forwards
2011 deaths
People from Ruabon
Sportspeople from Wrexham County Borough
Welsh footballers